Vatica bantamensis is a species of plant in the family Dipterocarpaceae. It is a tree endemic to Java in Indonesia. It is an endangered species.

References

bantamensis
Endemic flora of Java
Trees of Java
Endangered flora of Asia
Taxonomy articles created by Polbot